Jack Fleming (26 August 1876 – 19 September 1933) was an  Australian rules footballer who played with South Melbourne in the Victorian Football League (VFL).

Notes

External links 

1876 births
1933 deaths
Australian rules footballers from Victoria (Australia)
Sydney Swans players